Maxime Edouard Camille Blanchard, or just Maxi Blanchard, (born 27 September 1986) is a French former professional footballer who played as defender and defensive midfielder. He played in the Football League for Tranmere Rovers, Plymouth Argyle and Newport County, in his native league Championnat National for Laval, L'Entente SSG and Moulins, and in the League of Ireland Premier Division for Shamrock Rovers.

Career
Maxime Blanchard began his career in Alençon, a commune in Normandy, before joining his first professional club – Laval. He spent two years in the youth team before being promoted to train with the senior squad during the 2005–06 season. Blanchard made his senior debut in Championnat National the following season and went on to appear in another 25 league matches for Laval over the next two years. He spent the 2008–09 campaign with L'Entente SSG, where he scored his first league goal, and the next with Moulins – making 35 league appearances in both.

He moved to England in the summer of 2010, signing for Football League One club Tranmere Rovers. He made his debut in a 0–0 draw against Huddersfield Town and went on to make 24 appearances during the 2010–11 season. He left Tranmere at the end of the campaign. Blanchard signed a short-term contract with Plymouth Argyle in November. He made his debut in a 4–1 win against Northampton Town, and extended his contract in January 2012 until the end of the season. Blanchard scored his first goal for the club in a 1–1 draw with Crawley Town.

Blanchard signed a new two-year contract in May, and won the club's Player of the Year award for the 2011–12 season. He made 28 league appearances, in which he scored two goals and, according to The Herald, had a "formidable partnership" with Darren Purse.

In 2015, he moved to Ireland and signed one-year contract with Shamrock Rovers. He left the club in July 2016 and joined the UK League Two side Newport County on a game-by-game contract.

Personal life
Maxime Blanchard retired from the professional game, and converted into tech sales.

Career statistics

References

External links

1986 births
Living people
Sportspeople from Alençon
French footballers
Footballers from Normandy
Association football defenders
Championnat National players
English Football League players
League of Ireland players
Stade Lavallois players
Entente SSG players
AS Moulins players
Tranmere Rovers F.C. players
Plymouth Argyle F.C. players
Shamrock Rovers F.C. players
Newport County A.F.C. players
French expatriate footballers
French expatriate sportspeople in England
Expatriate footballers in England
French expatriate sportspeople in Ireland
Expatriate association footballers in Ireland
French expatriate sportspeople in Wales
Expatriate footballers in Wales